Shoplifting is the crime of stealing goods from a retail store.

Shoplifting, Shoplifter, or Shoplifters may also refer to:
 Shoplifting (band)
 Shoplifting (album), an album by Straw
 Shoplifters (film), a 2018 Japanese drama film by Hirokazu Kore-eda
 "Shoplifter", a B-side to a European single of "American Idiot" by Green Day